On November 29, 1978 a powerful magnitude 7.7–7.8 earthquake struck off the coast of the southern Mexican state Oaxaca.

Tectonic setting 
Along the west coast of Mexico, the Rivera, Cocos and Nazca Plate dives beneath the North American and Caribbean Plate in a process known as subduction. This occurs along the Middle America Trench which runs from Mexico down to Costa Rica for over 2,750 km. The subduction zone is a large thrust fault that has produced devastating earthquakes in human history. Subduction has also resulted in volcanic activity in central Mexico.

Earthquake 
The earthquake ruptured an area of 5,525 km3 along with the boundary interface of the Cocos and North American Plates. That particular segment has not produced any large earthquakes since 1928 and 1931 and thus considered a seismic gap. A major earthquake of magnitude 7.5 ± 2.5 was forecasted at that area in 1973.

Maximum intensity in the Oaxaca area reached VIII (Severe) on the Modified Mercalli intensity scale.

This quake is well known as one out of the two earthquakes that forecasted in advance in the West. The other was the magnitude 5.9, 1975 Oroville earthquake in California, both due to irregular seismic activities in the area before the main shock.

Impact 
Nine people were killed, eight of those were from Mexico City one from Oaxaca. A few buildings in Mexico City had minor damage; this was contrary to the numerous newspaper reports that many buildings had collapsed. Eyewitness reported many buildings swaying during the earthquake. Two buildings; the Treasury Building and another owned by the Bank of Mexico suffered considerable damage to their exterior.

References 

1978 earthquakes
Earthquakes in Mexico
Megathrust earthquakes in Mexico
History of Oaxaca
1978 disasters in Mexico
1978 in Mexico